Our Country is a 2006 Italian drama film directed by Francesca Comencini. It entered the competition at the 2006 Rome Film Festival.

Cast 

Luca Zingaretti: Ugo
Valeria Golino: Rita
Laura Chiatti: Elodie
Luca Argentero: Gerry
Valentina Lodovini: Wife of Gerry
Bebo Storti:  Glauco Bottini 
Giuseppe Battiston: Otello
Fabio Ghidoni: Matteo

References

External links

2006 films
Italian drama films
2006 drama films
Films directed by Francesca Comencini
2000s Italian films